Lieutenant General Sir Harold Redman,  (25 August 1899 – 1986) was a senior British Army officer and Governor of Gibraltar.

Military career
Redman was commissioned into the Royal Artillery 28 February 1917. He served in the First World War in France and Belgium during 1918 and later Germany.

He served in India and was the aide-de-camp to the General Officer Commanding Waziristan Force from 20 November 1923 to 19 October 1924, for which he was mentioned in despatches (London Gazette 13 March 1925).

He transferred to the King's Own Yorkshire Light Infantry in February 1929, whilst attending the Staff College, Camberley from 1929 to 1930, alongside fellow students such as Neil Ritchie, George Erskine, Ivor Hughes, Harold Freeman-Attwood, Herbert Lumsden.

He became an instructor at the Senior Officers' School at Sheerness in October 1937 and then moved on to be an instructor at the Staff College, Camberley from 15 November 1938 to 13 August 1939.

He served on the staff at the War Office from 14 August 1939 to 2 July 1940.

He served in the Second World War, being appointed Commanding Officer of 7th Battalion King's Own Yorkshire Light Infantry in July 1940. Then in February 1941 he became Commander 151st Infantry Brigade until 12 December 1941 which took him to North Africa, Cyprus and the Middle East.

He was made a Brigadier on the General Staff of the British Eighth Army in North Africa from 13 December 1941 to 27 March 1942.

On 30 March 1942 he became Commander of 10th Indian Motor Brigade until 1 March 1943 after which he went on to be British Secretary to Combined Chiefs of Staff in Washington D.C. He was appointed Deputy Commander for the French Forces of the Interior in 1944 and Deputy Head of Supreme Headquarters of the Allied Expeditionary Force Mission to France later that year.

After the war he initially became Head of the British Military Mission to France and then in 1946 he became Chief of Staff to Allied Land Forces South East Asia. He was made Director of Military Operations at the War Office in 1948 and Principal Staff Officer to the Supreme Allied Commander Europe in 1951.

He was made Vice-Chief Imperial General Staff in 1952 and Governor and Commander-In-Chief of Gibraltar in 1955. He retired in 1958.

In retirement he became the first Director and Secretary of the Wolfson Foundation in 1958.

References

Bibliography

External links
Generals of World War II

|-

1899 births
1986 deaths
British Army generals of World War II
British Army personnel of World War I
Commanders of the Legion of Merit
Commanders of the Order of the British Empire
Governors of Gibraltar
Graduates of the Staff College, Camberley
King's Own Yorkshire Light Infantry officers
Knights Commander of the Order of the Bath
Royal Artillery officers
British Army lieutenant generals
Academics of the Staff College, Camberley